Laleham Lea is a co-educational private primary school in located Peaks Hill, Purley, Greater London.

The school prepares pupils for entrance to selective and independent schools. In the past, many of the school's male cohort would be prepared for the entrance tests and interviews for The John Fisher School (across the road) and The London Oratory School which were selective Catholic schools for much of the 1990s and mid-late 2000s.

Today some pupils still transfer to London and Surrey faith schools but a considerable number now go onto local independent schools, and grammar schools in neighbouring Sutton.

Notable former pupils
Dan Leek, Rugby Union Player

References

1906 establishments in England
Educational institutions established in 1906
Private co-educational schools in London
Private schools in the London Borough of Croydon
Roman Catholic private schools in the Archdiocese of Southwark